The Australian Aluminium Council is an Australian industry association representing companies involved in bauxite mining and the refining, production and distribution of aluminium.

Miles Prosser has been the Executive Director of the Australian Aluminium Council since 2008.

Membership 
Council members include some of Australia's largest companies, including Alcoa, Alumina Limited, Rio Tinto Aluminium, and Hydro Aluminium. Member companies of the Australian Aluminium Council produce 26 percent of global alumina sales and are collectively the fifth largest producer of aluminium. The Australian aluminium industry employs around 17,000 workers directly and generates export earnings worth over $8.3 billion.

Role of the Council 
The Council is the peak industry association representing the Australian Aluminium industry. The Council promotes the use of Australian aluminium products nationally and internationally. A technical standards group within the Council also develops and maintains material specifications and technical data for industry use, and the Council produces an annual statistical analysis of materials consumption, aluminium production and exports by Australia's six aluminium smelters and one aluminum-rolled product plant.

As an industry advocate, the Council has strongly opposed greenhouse gas emissions trading schemes on the basis that anti-emission technology is insufficient to minimise the cost impact on producers, and that international action on greenhouse gases should precede Australian programs. The Council also notes that while greenhouse gas emissions from Australian aluminium smelters rose 29 percent since 1990 to a peak of 13.9 million tonnes in 2006, this lags behind a 64 percent increase in aluminium production over the same period.

See also
 Mining in Australia

References

External links 
 

Business organisations based in Australia
Aluminium companies of Australia